Zafra savignyi is a species of sea snail in the family Columbellidae, the dove snails. The species inhabits the Red Sea and the eastern Mediterranean.

References

savignyi
Gastropods described in 1939